Nancy Dinah Elly Khedouri  (born 1975) is a Bahraini politician, businesswoman and writer. She has been a National Assembly of Bahrain member since 2010.

Biography
The Khedouris family are one of the Jewish families in Bahrain, a family of importers of tablecloths and linens. Her direct family is third generation in Bahrain, and she is the cousin of Houda Nonoo, the Bahraini Ambassador to the United States from 2008 to 2013.

In her 2007 book From Our Beginning to Present Day, she documented the history of Bahraini Jews from the first settlers (late 1880s) to our days.

In 2010, Nancy Khedouri became a member of the National Assembly of Bahrain. She has worked on smoothening relationships with Israel by appearing publicly with political figures such as Yisrael Katz. In April 2017, she represented her country at the World Jewish Congress.

Works
From Our Beginning to Present Day , Manama, Bahrain, 2007

References

Living people
Bahraini Jews
Members of the Consultative Council (Bahrain)
Jewish Bahraini politicians
Bahraini women in politics
Bahraini women's rights activists
Jewish feminists
Bahraini feminists
Year of birth missing (living people)
21st-century Bahraini women politicians
21st-century Bahraini politicians
Sephardi politicians